INSP (formerly The Inspiration Network; the initialism is sounded out letter-by-letter) is an American digital cable television network that features primarily westerns (both shows and movies) and is headquartered in Indian Land, South Carolina - a suburb of Charlotte, North Carolina.

Between 1991 and 2010, INSP was a non-profit ministry focused network. In October 2010, it was re-branded and launched as a socially conservative, commercial-supported family entertainment network (over time becoming centered around westerns), and has Nielsen C3 ratings status. As of 2021, more than 60 million households receive INSP.

History

INSP was founded in 1978 as the PTL Television Network, a religious television network founded by Christian televangelists Jim Bakker and his wife, Tammy Faye Bakker. The network was the flagship channel for their daily Christian variety program, The PTL Club. The network later became known as the PTL Satellite Network and finally PTL – The Inspirational Network.

In 1990, after Jim Bakker resigned, the PTL Television network filed for bankruptcy. Morris Cerullo World Evangelism eventually purchased the network from the United States Bankruptcy Court in Columbia, South Carolina. Morris’ son, David, was later named CEO of the network. David Cerullo remains as its CEO.

In October 2010, the network announced a major re-branding with an added emphasis on family programming. Along with the re-branding came a new logo, tagline and name change from Inspiration to INSP. At the end of 2021, Variety reported that INSP's household viewers were up 1,171% since 2010.

In 2022, INSP changed its logo to include a cowboy hat to emphasize the growing success of its western-based shows and films. Prior to the logo change, INSP had also introduced the tagline, “Heroes Live Here.” Its focus on western-based programming is said to be the reason behind its continued ratings success, with primetime viewing growing 17% on the previous year.

On March 30, 2022, it was announced that INSP via Imagicomm Communications would enter the broadcasting business by purchasing 18 stations in 12 markets from Cox Media Group, namely KYMA in Yuma, Arizona; KIEM and KVIQ-LD in Eureka, California; KPVI in Idaho Falls, Idaho; KLAX in Alexandria, Louisiana; WABG, WNBD and WXVT in Greenwood, Mississippi; WICZ in Binghamton, New York; WSYT in Syracuse, New York; KOKI and KMYT in Tulsa, Oklahoma; KMVU and KFBI-LD in Medford, Oregon; WHBQ in Memphis, Tennessee; KAYU in Spokane, Washington; and KCYU-LD and KFFX in Yakima, Washington for an undisclosed price to help them comply with regulatory requirements related to a proposed merger with Tegna and Standard Media. The sale was completed on August 1.

Cowboy Way Channel
In May 2022, INSP launched the Cowboy Way Channel, a Internet streaming service aimed at younger viewers. Named for INSP's original series, The Cowboy Way: Alabama, the channel features other original series and Western- and outdoor-themed movies.

Programming
Currently INSP features mostly Westerns (both series and movies), with Mike Murdock's Campmeeting in the early mornings.

Original programming
In its early years, INSP produced numerous original specials, concerts, and inspirational entertainment programs.

The development of original entertainment content became a focus after the 2010 re-brand, beginning with A Walton’s Family Reunion, starring surviving cast members of The Waltons who journey back to Walton's Mountain almost 30 years after the series ended its iconic run.

In 2011, a web network series entitled Moments was launched. Originally airing exclusively on INSP, Moments is an original, short-form inspirational video series that ranges in formats like documentary, narrative, and interviews, with each sharing an uplifting story. One of the featured short videos, "Thank You For Your Service", quickly went viral: it has been featured on ABC’s  The View, the Pentagon Channel, and USAA’s web site. It has been shown at several national conventions and conferences, including the American Legion, Veterans of Foreign Wars, Vietnam Veterans of America, and Jewish War Veterans. In 2013, INSP was honored by the Vietnam War Commemoration for Thank You For Your Service. General Claude “Mick” Kicklighter noted the video's impact: “This stirring tribute never fails to inspire deep emotions. It has helped bring healing and encouragement to true patriots, many of whom have felt taken for granted and ignored.”

Old Henry is a series of interstitials on INSP that starred Ralph Waite (The Waltons) and Rachel Hendrix (October Baby). The drama initially aired in October 2013 as a series of six interstitials, with a 30-minute version produced to incorporate the entire series along with never-before-seen footage and exclusive interviews.

In early 2014, INSP moved forward in their commitment to original content, creating the position of Vice President of Original Programming.

In 2015, INSP co-produced, with Susie Films, an original American reality television series entitled Handcrafted America. Handcrafted America originally aired exclusively on INSP. After its linear run, the series was licensed by Amazon Prime. In Handcrafted America, host Jill Wagner travels the country to seek out talented artisans who continue to make products the traditional way—with their own two hands. Throughout each program, artisans are given the opportunity to reveal the history and cultural heritage that inspire and influence the design of their handcrafted products.

In 2016, INSP co-produced, with RIVR Media, an original American reality television series entitled State Plate. State Plate originally aired exclusively on INSP.  It is now available on streaming services. The series stars former American Idol winner Taylor Hicks, who travels the country tasting each state's most symbolic and popular foods, from appetizers and main courses to sides and desserts. Maureen McCormick also served as a guest host on the show.

During the same year, INSP piloted a reality series, The Cowboy Way. The show ran until 2020 for a total of seven seasons.

Facilities and studio
INSP originally was headquartered in studios and offices in Charlotte, North Carolina. The broadcast facility remains in Charlotte, while the network's offices have been relocated to a newly constructed campus known as CrossRidge (formerly named the City of Light) in Indian Land, South Carolina, with an eventually consolidation of all operations at CrossRidge to come.

Television stations

Accolades
INSP has been honored with several industry awards in television:

2012: The PTC Seal of Approval from the Parents Television Council
2012: Cablefax FAXIES Awards finalist in two categories; Trade Show Marketing/PR and Direct Response Marketing
2013: Nominated in the Category for Human Concerns at The New York Film & Television Festival
2014: CableFax Digital Awards finalist in their Social Good Campaign for Moments.org
2014: Telly Awards:
The Silver award in the Category of Entertainment for Going Home
The Bronze award in the Category of Entertainment for Italian Family
The Bronze award in the Category of Use of Humor for Italian Family
2016: CableFax Program Award: Jill Wagner, Best Family Friendly Host, “Handcrafted America Season 1”
2017: Telly Awards:
The Bronze award in the Category of General Cultural for ‘’Handcrafted America’’
The Bronze award in the Category of General Travel/Tourism for ‘’Handcrafted America’’
2017: CableFax Program Award: Taylor Hicks, Best Family Friendly Host, “State Plate”

See also
 Grit (TV network)

References

External links
 
 Imagicomm Communications
 Moments.org
 INSP Affiliates
 The Cowboy Way Channel website

Television networks in the United States
English-language television stations in the United States
Religious television
Religious television stations in the United States
Television channels and stations established in 1978